Quentin R. Orlando (November 8, 1919 – January 22, 2011) was a former Democratic member of the Pennsylvania State Senate, serving from 1973 to 1980. He was the first individual with a Doctor of Optometry to be elected to the Pennsylvania General Assembly. He and fellow Senator Lou Coppersmith were the main sponsors of the "Diagnostic Drug Bill."

He served two terms as a member of the Erie City Council. He practiced optometry in the Erie, Pennsylvania area for over fifty years. He served two stints on the Pennsylvania State Board of Optometry, once during the late 1960s and early 1970s as an appointee of Governor Raymond P. Shafer and later during the late 1990s and early 2000s as an appointee of Governor Tom Ridge.

References

1919 births
2011 deaths
Pennsylvania city council members
Democratic Party Pennsylvania state senators
Politicians from Erie, Pennsylvania
American optometrists